The Nebula Award for Best Game Writing is one of the various Nebula Awards presented each year by the Science Fiction and Fantasy Writers of America (SFWA) for science fiction or fantasy game writing, defined as "an interactive or playable story-driven work which conveys narrative, character, or story background". To be eligible for Nebula Award consideration a work must be published in English in the United States. Works published in English elsewhere in the world are also eligible provided they are released on either a website or in an electronic edition. Works in this category have no set word count and must have at least one credited writer. The Nebula Award for Best Game Writing has been awarded annually since 2019. The Nebula Awards have been described as one of "the most important of the American science fiction awards" and "the science-fiction and fantasy equivalent" of the Emmy Awards. The Game Writing category is the newest category of the Nebulas, which were originally awarded in 1966 solely for printed fiction. The drive to create the Game Writing category was promoted by then SFWA president Cat Rambo after game writers were made eligible for SFWA membership in 2016. According to a statement by SFWA when the category was announced, it was added to reflect how changes in technology had expanded the media used for science fiction and fantasy storytelling.

Nebula Award nominees and winners are chosen by members of the SFWA, though the authors of the nominees do not need to be a member. Works are nominated each year by members in a period around December 15 through January 31, and the six works that receive the most nominations then form the final ballot, with additional nominees possible in the case of ties. Soon after, members are given a month to vote on the ballot, and the final results are presented at the Nebula Awards ceremony in May. Writers are not permitted to nominate their own works, and ties in the final vote are broken, if possible, by the number of nominations the works received.

During the 5 nomination years, 27 games by 78 writers have been nominated. These have primarily been video games, but also include seven books for role-playing game systems and an interactive film. The first year was won by Charlie Brooker for the interactive film Black Mirror: Bandersnatch; the second year was won by a team of nine writers led by Leonard Boyarsky for the video game The Outer Worlds; the third year was won by Greg Kasavin for the video game Hades; and the fourth year by a team of six writers for the role-playing game Thirsty Sword Lesbians. Only four writers have been nominated more than once, with two nominations each for Dominique Dickey, Kate Dollarhyde, Kate Heartfield, and Natalia Theodoridou. Interactive fiction developer Choice of Games has the most games nominated with six over four years.

Winners and nominees
In the following table, the years correspond to the date of the ceremony, rather than when the game was first published. Each year links to the corresponding "year in video games". Entries with a blue background and an asterisk (*) next to the writer's name have won the award; those with a white background are the other nominees on the shortlist. Entries with a gray background and a plus sign (+) mark a year when "no award" was selected as the winner.

  *   Winners and joint winners
  +   No winner selected

References

External links
 Nebula Awards official site

Awards established in 2019
Game Writing